The 1996 AMP Bathurst 1000 was an endurance race for Group 3A 5.0 Litre Touring Cars held on 6 October 1996 at the Mount Panorama Circuit near Bathurst in New South Wales, Australia. The race, which was the 37th running of the Bathurst 1000, was won by Craig Lowndes and Greg Murphy driving a Holden VR Commodore.

Entry list

Results

Top ten shootout

Race

Statistics
 Provisional Pole Position – #30 Glenn Seton – 2:10.0077
 Pole Position – #30 Glenn Seton – 2:11.0160
 Fastest Lap – #1 Craig Lowndes – 2:13.1636 - Lap 149
 Winners' Average Speed – 139.75 km/h
 Race Time - 7:09:28.3584

See also
1996 Australian Touring Car season

References

External links
 Official race results
 Official V8 Supercar website
 CAMS Manual reference to Australian titles
 race results

Motorsport in Bathurst, New South Wales
AMP Bathurst 1000